River Falls is a city in Pierce and St. Croix counties in the U.S. state of Wisconsin. It is adjacent to the Town of River Falls in Pierce County and the Town of Kinnickinnic in St. Croix County. River Falls is the most populous city in Pierce County. The population was 16,182 at the 2020 census, with 11,851 residing in Pierce County and 3,149 in St. Croix County.

River Falls is the home of the University of Wisconsin–River Falls.

History
The city's first settlers were Joel Foster and his indentured servant, Dick, in 1848. The village was started as Kinnickinnic in 1854 by brothers Nathaniel N. and Oliver S. Powell, who were from St. Lawrence County, New York. At the time, the town and village were also known as Greenwood, but this was changed, as another Greenwood, Wisconsin already existed. The present name comes from the Kinnickinnic River rapids.

On June 23, 1893, a lightning bolt hit the center circus pole at a Ringling Brothers circus performance in River Falls, injuring multiple audience members and performers and killing seven.

Geography
River Falls is located at  (44.858701, −92.625097).

River Falls lies on the banks of the Kinnickinnic River, a class one trout stream. The South Fork of the Kinnickinnic River runs through the city, dividing the University of Wisconsin-River Falls campus into two sections.

Demographics

2000 census
At the 2000 census there were 12,560 people, 4,269 households, and 2,335 families living in the city. The racial makeup of the city was 96.57% White, 0.53% Black or African American, 0.36% Native American, 1.02% Asian, 0.09% Pacific Islander, 0.32% from other races, and 1.12% from two or more races. Hispanic or Latino of any race were 0.95%.

Of the 4,269 households 29.1% had children under the age of 18 living with them, 42.7% were married couples living together, 9.1% had a female householder with no husband present, and 45.3% were non-families. 27.7% of households were one person and 9.1% were one person aged 65 or older. The average household size was 2.44 and the average family size was 2.98.

The age distribution was 17.9% under the age of 18, 35.1% from 18 to 24, 23.8% from 25 to 44, 14.6% from 45 to 64, and 8.6% 65 or older. The median age was 24 years. For every 100 females, there were 83.5 males. For every 100 females age 18 and over, there were 80.1 males.

The median household income was $41,184 and the median family income  was $60,253. Males had a median income of $36,275 versus $27,345 for females. The per capita income for the city was $17,667. About 4.4% of families and 14.9% of the population were below the poverty line, including 6.6% of those under age 18 and 11.1% of those age 65 or over.

2010 census
At the 2010 census there were 15,000 people, 5,150 households, and 2,812 families living in the city. The racial makeup of the city was 94.8% White, 1.2% African American, 0.4% Native American, 1.5% Asian, 0.5% from other races, and 1.6% from two or more races. Hispanic or Latino of any race were 1.8%.

Of the 5,150 households 28.2% had children under the age of 18 living with them, 40.6% were married couples living together, 9.9% had a female householder with no husband present, 4.1% had a male householder with no wife present, and 45.4% were non-families. 27.1% of households were one person and 8.4% were one person aged 65 or older. The average household size was 2.42 and the average family size was 2.89.

The median age was 24.2 years. 17.2% of residents were under the age of 18; 34.5% were between the ages of 18 and 24; 23% were from 25 to 44; 17% were from 45 to 64; and 8.2% were 65 or older. The gender makeup of the city was 46.8% male and 53.2% female.

2020 census 
At the 2020 census, there were 16,182 people and 5,521 households.

Education
School District of River Falls operates public schools. River Falls High School is the district's public high school. Meyer Middle School acts as the district's middle school. There are also 5 public elementary schools in the school district.

River Falls is home to the University of Wisconsin-River Falls and a branch of the Chippewa Valley Technical College.

Recreation 

The Kinnickinnic River, which flows through the heart of the city and its downtown business district, is a popular recreational attraction in River Falls for fly fishers and kayakers.

On the bluffs of the Kinnickinnic River is Glen Park, a 41-acre park established in 1898. The park has playgrounds, a swimming pool, soccer fields, a softball diamond, basketball courts, horseshoe pits, a gazebo, and several miles of walking trails. The Glen Park Pool was built in 1937 and renovated for its 75th anniversary in 2012. Glen Park's Swinging Bridge offers a view of the South Fork rapids as it enters the Kinnickinnic River. The bridge, a replica of one designed by the Minneapolis Bridge Company and constructed in 1925, is a suspension bridge that spans the South Fork Rapids at the site of the former Cascade Mill and Dam. Below the bridge are fishing, swimming, and picnic spots.

Hoffman Park, located northeast of downtown River Falls, is a  facility that contains baseball fields, a nine-hole disc golf course, a campsite, a skate park, volleyball courts, and the Tri-Angels Playground. The playground was named after Amara, Sophie, and Cecilia Schaffhausen, who were murdered by their father, Aaron Schaffhausen. The playground, accessible to handicapped children and built with designs referring to the three girls, opened in 2015. It was constructed at a cost of $550,000 by volunteers.

Another attraction is The Falls Theater, a movie theater.

Notable people

 Aldrich Hazen Ames, C.I.A. counter-intelligence officer and analyst; convicted in 1994 of spying for the Soviet Union and Russia
 Abraham D. Andrews, Wisconsin State Senator
 Lynn H. Ashley, Wisconsin State Assembly
 Jule Berndt, Wisconsin State Assembly
 William Berndt, Wisconsin State Senator
 Kevin Black, All American Wrestler and Olympic Coach
 Ellsworth Burnett, Wisconsin State Assembly
 Karyn Bye-Dietz, Olympic Gold Medal athlete
 George W. Chinnock, Wisconsin State Assembly
 Anna Dodge, actress
 Michael P. Early, Wisconsin State Assembly
 J. P. Feyereisen, MLB Relief Pitcher for the Tampa Bay Rays
 Jim Hall, creator of FreeDOS
 Sheila Harsdorf, Wisconsin State Senator
 Nils Pederson Haugen, (1849–1931) U.S. Representative from Wisconsin
 Jay R. Hinckley, Wisconsin State Assembly
 Robert P. Knowles, Wisconsin State Senator
 Warren P. Knowles, Governor of Wisconsin
 Maria Lamb, Olympic athlete and national champion speedskater
 Doug Lloyd, NFL player
 Freeman Lord, Wisconsin State Assembly
 Landon Lueck, reality TV star and professional cyclist
 Mark Neumann, U.S. Representative
 Frank Nye, U.S. Representative from Minnesota
 Francis Paul Prucha, Roman Catholic priest and educator
 Heidi "Frankie" Rayder, fashion model
 Missy Rayder, fashion model
 Dick Ritger, former professional ten-pin bowler and bowling coach; member of the PBA and USBC Halls of Fame
 George B. Skogmo, Wisconsin State Senator
 David F. Swensen, Chief Investment Officer of the Yale University endowment
 Horace Adolphus Taylor, Wisconsin State Senator
 Kenneth S. White, Wisconsin State Senator
 Stanley York, Wisconsin State Assembly
 Shannon Zimmerman, businessman

References

External links

City of River Falls
River Falls Chamber of Commerce
  

 
Cities in Wisconsin
Cities in Pierce County, Wisconsin
Cities in St. Croix County, Wisconsin
Minneapolis–Saint Paul